Saksi or Sokse is a mountain in Lom Municipality in Innlandet county, Norway. The mountain lies in the Smørstabbtindene mountains and it is surrounded by several other notable mountains including Rundhøe to the northeast; Stetinden and Stehøi to the southeast; Gravdalstinden, Storebjørn, and Veslebjørn to the south; Kalven to the southwest; and Kniven and Store Smørstabbtinden to the north. The first known ascent was in 1886 by Carl Hall and Mathias Soggemoen.

See also
List of mountains of Norway by height

References

Jotunheimen
Lom, Norway
Mountains of Innlandet